Phocus (Ancient Greek: Φῶκος means "seal") was the name of the eponymous hero of Phocis in Greek mythology. Ancient sources relate of more than one figure of this name, and of these at least two are explicitly said to have had Phocis named after them.

 Phocus, the son of Poseidon and Pronoe, possible eponym of Phocis according to a scholiast on the Iliad.
Phocus, son of Aeacus and Psamathe, also possible eponym of Phocis according to a scholiast on the Iliad.
 Phocus, son of Ornytion.
 Phocus, father of Callirhoe.
Phocus, father of Manthea(seems to be a variation of the Callisto story) who consorted with Zeus(who was in the form of a bear) and became the mother of Arctos(seems to be variation of the character of Arcas) by the god according to clementine literature,Recognitions.The figure is mentioned by the literature to criticize the evils of polytheism in the views of christianity, specifically focusing on adulteries of Zeus.
 Phocus and Priasus, two sons of Caeneus, were counted among the Argonauts.
Phocus the builder, son of Danaus, is mentioned by Hyginus among the Achaeans against Troy, but is otherwise unknown. Epeius, builder of the Trojan Horse, was a grandson of Phocus the son of Aeacus.

Phocus is also the name of the son of Phocion.

Notes

References 

 Pseudo-Apollodorus, The Library with an English Translation by Sir James George Frazer, F.B.A., F.R.S. in 2 Volumes, Cambridge, MA, Harvard University Press; London, William Heinemann Ltd. 1921. Online version at the Perseus Digital Library. Greek text available from the same website.
 Hyginus, Gaius Julius, Fabulae from The Myths of Hyginus translated and edited by Mary Grant. University of Kansas Publications in Humanistic Studies. Online version at the Topos Text Project.
 March, Jenny, Cassell's Dictionary of Classical Mythology, Casell & Co, 2001. . Internet Archive.
 Pausanias, Description of Greece with an English Translation by W.H.S. Jones, Litt.D., and H.A. Ormerod, M.A., in 4 Volumes. Cambridge, MA, Harvard University Press; London, William Heinemann Ltd. 1918. Online version at the Perseus Digital Library
 Pausanias, Graeciae Descriptio. 3 vols. Leipzig, Teubner. 1903.  Greek text available at the Perseus Digital Library.
 R. Scott Smith, Stephen Trzaskoma. Apollodorus' Library and Hyginus' Fabulae: Two Handbooks of Greek Mythology. Indianapolis: Hackett Pub., 2007. 64–65. Print.
 Stephanus of Byzantium, Stephani Byzantii Ethnicorum quae supersunt, edited by August Meineike (1790-1870), published 1849. A few entries from this important ancient handbook of place names have been translated by Brady Kiesling. Online version at the Topos Text Project.
 Smith, William, Dictionary of Greek and Roman Biography and Mythology, London (1873). Online version at the Perseus Digital Library.

Argonauts
Children of Poseidon
Boeotian mythology
Phocian characters in Greek mythology
Aeginetan characters in Greek mythology